Jaan Kruus (26 February 1884 – 15 May 1942) was an Estonian General.

Jaan Kruus was born in Sooniste Parish, Kreis Wiek (now, Märjamaa Parish, Rapla County). He fought in the Estonian War of Independence and afterwards pursued a military career. He was promoted to Major-General in 1936. In 1940, during the Soviet occupation of Estonia, he was transferred to the Red Army and was a commander in the 182nd Rifle Division, part of the 27th Army. However, he was later arrested and executed in Moscow in 1942.

References

1884 births
1942 deaths
People from Märjamaa Parish
People from Kreis Wiek
Estonian major generals
Soviet major generals
Imperial Russian Army officers
Russian military personnel of World War I
Estonian military personnel of the Estonian War of Independence
Soviet military personnel of World War II
Recipients of the Cross of St. George
Recipients of the Order of St. Vladimir, 4th class
Recipients of the Order of St. Anna, 2nd class
Recipients of the Order of St. Anna, 3rd class
Recipients of the Order of St. Anna, 4th class
Recipients of the Order of Saint Stanislaus (Russian), 2nd class
Recipients of the Order of Saint Stanislaus (Russian), 3rd class
Recipients of the Cross of Liberty (Estonia)
Recipients of the Order of Lāčplēsis, 3rd class
Recipients of the Order of the Three Stars
Recipients of the Order of Polonia Restituta
Estonian people executed by the Soviet Union